"No One" is a song recorded by American singer-songwriter Alicia Keys for her third studio album As I Am (2007). It was written and produced by Keys and Kerry Brothers Jr., with additional writing by DJ Dirty Harry. The song was released as the lead single from As I Am on October 9, 2007, by J Records.

A commercial success, "No One" topped the US Billboard Hot 100 for five consecutive weeks and also reached number one in Croatia, Hungary and Switzerland, while charting within the top ten in 18 additional countries. It was the third most successful song of 2008 in Brazil and the United States, and was the most listened song on US radio, with 3.08 million listeners. It was also the sixth most successful song of the 2000s decade in the US.

"No One" has been certified septuple platinum by the Recording Industry Association of America (RIAA), and has sold 5.6 million copies worldwide. Critically acclaimed, it won Best Female R&B Vocal Performance and Best R&B Song at the 50th Annual Grammy Awards (2008).

Background and release

"No One" was written and produced by Alicia Keys, Kerry Brothers Jr., and George M. Harry. Keys told MTV News Canada that the song, "is really talking about the way that in relationships, the way that so many things are around you all the time to try to distract you. And even though people may talk and say whatever they may want to say, but then no one can get in the way of this." Keys said that it was a song that "just wrote itself". It was one of the last songs written for the album.

The song was first heard in August 2007 after Keys included a clip of the song in a newsletter on her official website and fan club. It was released officially on September 10, 2007, and its radio premiere was on Atlanta's WVEE on August 29. Keys performed a medley of "No One" with George Michael's "Freedom! '90" at the 2007 MTV Video Music Awards on September 9. Remixes of the song featuring Lil' Kim, Damian Marley, Junior Reid, Beenie Man, Barbee, and Kanye West exist. The official remix has a different but similar beat from the original version and features rapper Cassidy; it was produced by Swizz Beatz.

Critical reception
"No One" received critical acclaim upon release. Popjustice viewed the song as "one of [Keys'] best singles to date and possibly one of the eight best ballads of 2007". Chuck Taylor of Billboard wrote that the song "shows the soulful chanteuse acting her age, in the best possible way" and that Keys "hold[s] back on the mastery of vocal craft to let cool, crisp production lead", adding that it "heralds her youth, while maintaining Keys' lockdown on penetrating hooks and soul-sopped production with a buoyancy that makes it a blast to sing along with." Anthony Venutolo of The Star-Ledger felt that on "No One", Keys "attempts to offer uplift through cliches".

Alex Fletcher of Digital Spy gave the song four stars out of five and called it "simplistic yet beautiful, fluttering, piano-tinkling ballad", the lyrics of which "expose Keys' vulnerability and current loved-up status". David Mead of Paste commented that the song "showcases a new depth and width to the tone of her voice, which seems to get closer to that of Aretha Franklin with each album." Nekesa Mumbi Moody of The Washington Post cited "No One" as one of the "gems" of the album and stated it "recalls a Bob Marley groove".

Accolades
"No One" was ranked at number three on Entertainment Weeklys recap of "The 10 Best Songs of 2007", while it was voted number 23 on The Village Voices 2007 Pazz & Jop critics' poll (tied with Modest Mouse's "Dashboard", R. Kelly's "I'm a Flirt" (Remix) featuring T.I. and T-Pain, and Avril Lavigne's "Girlfriend").

Popjustice placed it at number 47 on their list of "The Greatest Singles of 2007". In November 2012, Complex placed it at number one on their list of "The 25 Best Alicia Keys Songs", commenting that the "production was supreme, her vocals were at their strongest, and beyond technical merit".

In November 2012, The Grio ranked it at number four on their list of "Alicia Keys' 15 Greatest Songs". BET included the song at number two on its list of "The 25 Best Alicia Keys Songs", because "Alicia's soaring, power-packed alto contrast[s] beautifully with the soft piano cascades to create an undeniable anthem". PopCrush placed it at number two on its list of "Top 10 Alicia Keys Songs".

Commercial performance

With only one full day of airplay, "No One" debuted at number 65 on the US Billboard Hot R&B/Hip-Hop Songs chart on the issue dated September 8, 2007. Seven weeks later, it reached the top position for 10 weeks—becoming Keys' fifth number-one single on the chart—before being knocked out by her own song "Like You'll Never See Me Again" during the first charting week of 2008. The song initially debuted at number 15 on the Bubbling Under Hot 100 Singles for the week of September 15, 2007, and managed to jump to the Billboard Hot 100 at number 71 the following week without the benefit of download sales. The following week, it rose to number 15 because of digital downloads, and reached the top spot the charting week of December 1, 2007, staying atop for five weeks, preventing Timbaland and OneRepublic's song "Apologize" from reaching the summit. In the week between October 22–25, 2007, "No One" gained 14.3% in radio airplay and audience impressions which marks the single at number one. It is Keys' first solo single to reach number one on the Hot 100 since her debut single "Fallin'" (2001) and her third single to top the chart. It is also the overall biggest hit that peaked in 2007.

Additionally, "No One" went on to top several other Billboard charts, including the Hot 100 Airplay (for 14 weeks in a row, the longest run atop the chart since Mariah Carey's 2005 song "We Belong Together" spent 16 weeks at number one), the Hot R&B/Hip-Hop Airplay, the Hot Adult R&B Airplay, the Pop 100, the Pop 100 Airplay, the Top 40 Mainstream, the Rhythmic Top 40, the Hot Digital Songs, and the Hot Digital Tracks. By June 2014, the song had sold four million copies in the United States. "No One" was the most listened-to song on US radio of 2008, with 3.08 billion listeners. Billboard ranked it at number 48 on the list of "The All-Time Top 100 Songs" in 2013 and at number 14 on the list of the "Top Billboard Hot 100 R&B/Hip-Hop Songs" in 2008. In 2009, the song was placed at number six on the Billboard Hot 100 decade-end chart.

The single was commercially successful in Europe as well, peaking at number two on the European Hot 100 Singles as well as reaching the top position in Hungary and Switzerland, and peaked within the top ten of the charts in Austria, Belgium, Denmark, France, Germany, Italy, the Netherlands, Norway, the Republic of Ireland, Slovakia, Spain, Sweden, and the United Kingdom. In the latter country, "No One" has re-entered the UK Singles Chart twice since its official release, both times due to exposure on British television (firstly after being performed by an auditionee on Britain's Got Talent and secondly after Keys herself performed it within a medley on The X Factor). In May 2009, it re-entered at number 54 on the UK Singles Chart, and in December 2009 it re-entered at number 51 on the chart.

It also charted highly in Oceania, peaking within the top ten of the charts in Australia and New Zealand. According to the International Federation of the Phonographic Industry (IFPI), "No One" has sold 5.6 million copies.

Music video

The music video for "No One", directed by Justin Francis, premiered on BET on September 24, 2007; it debuted on 106 and Park at number 10 the following day, and eventually peaked at number one. It premiered on Yahoo! Music on September 25 at number five and peaked at number one, and it premiered on Total Request Live on October 4 and peaked at number one. It debuted on VH1's VSpot Top 20 Countdown at number three, peaking at number one. The video was ranked at number 22 on VH1's "Top 40 Videos of 2007" and at number two on BET's "Notarized: Top 100 Videos of 2007".

The video consists of four settings: the first one shows Keys lying on a chair in an empty room; the second one is a room filled with musical instruments in which Keys sings accompanied by a Roland Jupiter-8 keyboard; in the third one Keys is initially alone, playing the piano on a rainy street, and she later finds herself surrounded with dozens of people; in the fourth and final one Keys is in a blue-lit nightclub. The video ends with a gear divided into four fractions, each one featuring a previously shown setting, with Keys lying on the chair in the same room shown at the beginning of the video.

Track listings

European CD single
 "No One" (Album Version) – 4:13
 "No One" (Curtis Lynch Reggae Mix) – 3:59

European limited-edition CD single
 "No One" (Album Version) – 4:13
 "No One" (Salaam Remi Mix) (featuring Junior Reid) – 4:50

European / Australian CD maxi single
 "No One" (Album Version) – 4:13
 "No One" (Curtis Lynch Reggae Mix) – 3:59
 "Superwoman" (Live) – 4:02
 "No One" (Video) 

US 12-inch single
A1. "No One" (Radio Mix) – 4:07
A2. "No One" (Instrumental) – 4:07
B1. "No One" (Curtis Lynch Reggae Remix) – 3:59
B2. "No One" (Curtis Lynch Reggae Remix – Instrumental) – 4:03

Digital EP
 "No One" – 4:14
 "No One" (Salaam Remi Mix) (featuring Junior Reid) – 4:51
 "No One" (Curtis Lynch Reggae Remix) – 3:56
 "Superwoman" (Live) – 4:29
 "No One" (Music Video)

Credits and personnel
Credits adapted from the liner notes of As I Am.

 Alicia Keys – production, vocals, piano, Jupiter synth, vocoder, Mellotron, programmed strings
 Kerry "Krucial" Brothers – production, programmed drums
 Dirty Harry – co-production
 Steve Mostyn – acoustic guitar, bass guitar
 Ann Mincieli – engineering, recording
 Brendan Dekora – engineering assistance
 Zach Hancock – engineering assistance
 Stuart White – engineering assistance
 Manny Marroquin – mixing
 Jared Robbins – mix assistance
 Dave Kutch – mastering

Charts

Weekly charts

Year-end charts

Decade-end charts

All-time charts

Certifications and sales

Release history

See also

 List of best-selling singles in the United States
 List of Billboard Hot 100 number-one singles of 2007
 List of Billboard Mainstream Top 40 number-one songs of 2008
 List of Hot 100 Airplay number-one singles of 2007 (U.S.)
 List of Hot 100 Airplay number-one singles of 2008 (U.S.)
 List of number-one digital singles of 2007 (Italy)
 List of number-one digital songs of 2007 (U.S.)
 List of number-one hits of 2007 (Switzerland)
 List of number-one R&B singles of 2007 (U.S.)

Notes

References

External links
 Official website 

2000s ballads
2007 singles
2007 songs
Alicia Keys songs
Billboard Hot 100 number-one singles
Contemporary R&B ballads
J Records singles
Music videos directed by Justin Francis
Number-one singles in Hungary
Number-one singles in Switzerland
Songs written by Alicia Keys
Songs written by Kerry Brothers Jr.
Song recordings produced by Alicia Keys